Abdulkarim al-Thani is a member of the Qatari royal family and an alleged terrorist facilitator.

Personal information 
Little is known about Abdulkarim al-Thani. He is believed to be a pious member of the royal family of Qatar and holds no government position. According to The New York Times, al-Thani has given donations to militant causes in the past, but has denied knowing that his money went towards terrorist operations.

Terrorism facilitating 
In 2003, The New York Times reported that a member of Qatar's royal family operated the Qatar safe house that the al-Qaeda leader Abu Musab al-Zarqawi stayed in when traveling in and out of Afghanistan. The article identifies the Qatari royal family member as Abdulkarim al-Thani, adding that he also provided Qatari passports and over $1 million in funds to support the terrorist network while traveling through Qatar. Al-Zarqawi ended up founding the predecessor of ISIS, al-Qaeda in Iraq.

The mastermind behind the 9/11 attacks, Khalid Sheikh Mohammed, also reportedly sought shelter in Qatar with the assistance of al-Thani.

References 

Living people
Qatari royalty
Year of birth missing (living people)